Rachel Graton (born August 29, 1985) is a Canadian playwright and actress from Quebec. She is most noted for her play La nuit du 4 au 5, which won the Prix Gratien-Gélinas in 2017 and was shortlisted for the Governor General's Award for French-language drama at the 2019 Governor General's Awards.

As an actress she has appeared in the films Miraculum, It's the Heart That Dies Last (C'est le cœur qui meurt en dernier) and Ghost Town Anthology (Répertoire des villes disparues), and the television series Trauma, Karl & Max, Boomerang, Au secours de Béatrice, Les Simone and Portrait-Robot (2021).

References

External links

1985 births
21st-century Canadian actresses
21st-century Canadian dramatists and playwrights
21st-century Canadian women writers
Actresses from Quebec
Canadian film actresses
Canadian stage actresses
Canadian television actresses
Canadian women dramatists and playwrights
Canadian dramatists and playwrights in French
French Quebecers
Writers from Quebec
Living people